Sen Mitsuji (三辻 茜, born November 26, 1987) is an Australian-Japanese actor and model. He is best known for his role as Shun Kenzaki in the YouTube science fiction series Origin. Recently, he starred in the Peacock series, Brave New World.

Early life
Sen Mitsuji was born, the first of two sons, to a Japanese entrepreneur father and an Australian artist mother in Sydney. He attended and graduated from Sydney Boys High School.

Career
Mitsuji was first scouted as a model at a music concert while part of a collegiate study abroad program in Tokyo. Though he returned to Australia to finish university studies, after graduation he moved back to Tokyo where he worked as a print and runway model, often featured in popular Japanese men's magazine, Men's Non-No (メンズノンノ) prior to his foray into acting. In 2015, he directed and wrote a short film in Japanese titled In Time.

His first major acting role was in the short lived YouTube Premium series Origin as Shun. Of the series he stated, "I’d never seen anything written [like it]. And that’s exciting—to do something where you’re not conscious of having to avoid any sort of trope that exists already, just free to interpret it as you’d like, without being constrained [by] what’s come before you." Mitsuji has further voiced his love of sci-fi and fantasy, which he has stated are very similar in their paradoxical mix of escapism and incisive commentary. In February 2020, Mitsuji starred in a recurring role on the second season of the Netflix science fiction series Altered Carbon. In the same year, Mitsuji starred as Henry Foster in the miniseries adaptation of Brave New World. His character was described as "an Alpha Plus in every way".

Personal life
He is a player on the club baseball team, Nakameguro Punch. He resides in Tokyo.
He is married to the Japanese/Brazilian model Kana Oya since September 2022.

Filmography

References

External links

Living people
1987 births
Australian actors
Australian male models
Models from Sydney
Australian people of Japanese descent
Male actors from Sydney
People educated at Sydney Boys High School